Eriogonum longifolium var. lindheimeri, commonly known as Lindheimer's long-leaf eriogonum and Lindheimer's buckwheat, is a dicot of the family Polygonaceae, found in New Mexico and Texas.

See also
 Eriogonum longifolium var. gnaphalifolium
 Eriogonum longifolium var. harperi

Notes

longifolium var. lindheimeri
Flora of New Mexico
Flora of Texas